Keystone Hook and Ladder Company is a historic fire station located at Reading, Berks County, Pennsylvania.  It was built in 1886–1887, and is a two-story, brick building in the Queen Anne style. A two-story annex was added in 1888 or 1890.  The front facade features a wooden bell tower with a pyramidal roof.

It was listed on the National Register of Historic Places in 1985.

References

Buildings and structures in Reading, Pennsylvania
Queen Anne architecture in Pennsylvania
Fire stations completed in 1887
Defunct fire stations in Pennsylvania
Fire stations on the National Register of Historic Places in Pennsylvania
National Register of Historic Places in Reading, Pennsylvania
1887 establishments in Pennsylvania